A pomegranate is a fruit-bearing shrub or tree.

Pomegranate may also refer to:

Places
 Pomegranate, California, U.S., a former settlement and mining camp

Art, entertainment, and media

Music
Groups
 Pomegranates (band), an American indie rock band
Albums
 Pomegranate (album), a 2008 album by Astronautalis
 Pomegranates (album), a 2015 album by Nicolas Jaar
Songs
 Pomegranate, a song by Deadmau5 and The Neptunes

Other art, entertainment, and media
 Pomegranate (phone), a fictional mobile phone created on behalf of the Government of Nova Scotia
 The Pomegranate (journal), an academic journal covering the field of Pagan studies

Publishers
 Pomegranate (publisher), a California-based art book and print publisher
 Pomegranate Press, a vanity press run by Kathryn Leigh Scott